The Skirmish of Littlestown was a Pennsylvania military engagement before the Battle of Gettysburg in which "a few companies of skirmishers" of Union infantry defeated a Confederate detachment of J.E.B. Stuart's Cavalry Division.

Background
On the night of June 29, 1863,  the Army of the Potomac was deployed in the Pipe Creek defense in northern Maryland with cavalry divisions north of the state line at Fairfield and at Littlestown (Farnsworth's Brigade  of Kilpatrick's Cavalry Division left Littlestown for Hanover in a light rain).  Stuart's Confederate cavalry had encamped just south of the Mason–Dixon line: "Before dawn on the last day of June, scouts returned with word that enemy cavalry was operating northwest of Union Mills just across the Pennsylvania line at Littletown" , and Stuart's forces"marched by crossroads to Hanover"--meeting the Union cavalry in the Battle of Hanover.

Engagement
Behind the Confederate cavalry was Union infantry which when at Union Mills, identified a Confederate cavalry detachment at Littlestown.  Three brigades of the Union "Third brigade at the rear of the division" advanced through the Federal column to proceed ahead to Littlestown, where their skirmishers "brushed away"/"warded off" the cavalry detachment.  (Also at Littlestown, Candy's Brigade of the XII Corps, 2nd Division, skirmished with Confederate Cavalry.)

References

Littlestown, Skirmish of
Littlestown, Skirmish of
Littlestown, Skirmish of
Littlestown
History of Adams County, Pennsylvania
1863 in Pennsylvania
June 1863 events